Utoy Cemetery is one of the oldest cemeteries within the current city limits of Atlanta in the U.S. state of Georgia and is listed on the National Register of Historic Places. Located near the intersection of Venetian Drive SW and Cahaba Drive SW in Venetian Hills, Southwest Atlanta, it was used for burials as early as 1828.  Atlanta's first physician is buried at the site, and an early sheriff of DeKalb County was clerk of the church (but is not buried at the site).

References

Further reading
 White, T.J. (2012). Utoy Primitive Baptist Church: A New History, via Scribd

External links
 

Cemeteries in Atlanta
History of Atlanta
African-American history in Atlanta